Shadow of the Eagle is a 1950 British-Italian historical drama film directed by Sidney Salkow and starring Richard Greene, Valentina Cortese and Greta Gynt. A separate Italian version The Rival of the Empress was released the following year.

It was shot partly at Teddington Studios and partly on location in Italy. The film's art direction was by Wilfred Shingleton.

Plot
During the 18th century the Empress of Russia Catherine the Great sends her lover Count Alexei Orloff to kidnap her rival for the throne, the pretender Elizabeth, Princess Tarakanova, from Venice. However, Orloff ends up falling in love with the Princess.

Cast
 Richard Greene as Count Alexei Orloff
 Valentina Cortese as Elizabeth, Princess Tarakanova
 Greta Gynt as Countess Loradona Camponiello  
 Binnie Barnes as Catherine - Empress of Russia
 Charles Goldner as General Korsakov  
 Hugh French as Captain Sergei Nikolsky  
 Walter Rilla as Prince Radziwill  
 Dennis Vance as Vasska, Orloff's Aide  
 William Tubbs as Boris  
 Cippi Valli as Maid  
 Dino Galvani as Russian Ambassador  
 Ewan Roberts as Ship's Doctor  
 A. De Leo as Polish Guard  
 Gianantonio Porcheddu as Partisan

See also
 Princess Tarakanova (1910)
 Tarakanova (1930)
 Princess Tarakanova (1938)
 The Rival of the Empress (1951)

References

Bibliography
 Richards, Jeffrey. Swordsmen of the Screen: From Douglas Fairbanks to Michael York. Routledge, 2014.

External links

1950 films
British historical drama films
1950s historical drama films
Italian historical drama films
1950s English-language films
Films directed by Sidney Salkow
Films set in Russia
Films set in Venice
Films set in the 18th century
Films about Catherine the Great
Films shot at Teddington Studios
British multilingual films
Italian multilingual films
1950s multilingual films
1950 drama films
British black-and-white films
Italian black-and-white films
1950s British films
1950s Italian films